Olga Osipyan (born 2 September 1995) is an Armenian footballer who plays as a midfielder for Ukrainian Women's League club Voskhod Stara Mayachka and the Armenia women's national team.

International career
Osipyan capped most recently for Armenia at senior level in two friendlies against Lithuania on 4 and 6 March 2020.

See also
List of Armenia women's international footballers

References

1995 births
Living people
Women's association football midfielders
Armenian women's footballers
Armenia women's international footballers
Russian Women's Football Championship players
Armenian expatriate footballers
Armenian expatriate sportspeople in Russia
Expatriate women's footballers in Russia
Armenian expatriate sportspeople in Kazakhstan
Expatriate women's footballers in Kazakhstan
Armenian expatriate sportspeople in Ukraine
Expatriate women's footballers in Ukraine